The 1955 Queen's Birthday Honours in New Zealand, celebrating the official birthday of Elizabeth II, were appointments made by the Queen on the advice of the New Zealand government to various orders and honours to reward and highlight good works by New Zealanders. They were announced on 9 June 1955.

The recipients of honours are displayed here as they were styled before their new honour.

Knight Bachelor
 Mr Justice Arthur Tyndall  – judge of the Court of Arbitration.

Order of the Bath

Companion (CB)
Military division
 Commodore Sir Charles Edward Madden  – Royal Navy (lately Chief of Naval Staff, Royal New Zealand Navy).

Order of Saint Michael and Saint George

Companion (CMG)
 George Thomas Bolt – chairman of the Public Service Commission.
 Stronach Paterson – of Wellington. For public services.

Order of the British Empire

Knight Commander (KBE)
Civil division
 The Honourable Walter James Broadfoot – lately Postmaster-General and Minister of Telegraphs.

Commander (CBE)
Civil division
 George William Clinkard . For services as secretary of the Department of Industries and Commerce and as a member of the Board of Trade.
 Alexander Robert Entrican – Director of Forestry.
 Andrew Sinclair Sutherland. For public services.
 James Leslie Allan Will  – of Christchurch; an orthopaedic surgeon.

Military division
 Group Captain Francis Ross Dix  – Royal New Zealand Air Force.

Officer (OBE)
Civil division
 Kenneth Curtis Aekins – of Mount Roskill. For services to the community.
 Walter Edwin Bate – of Hastings. For services to local government.
 Victoria Amohau Bennett – a chieftainess of the Te Āti Awa tribe. For services to the Māori people.
 Thomas Murray Charters – of Christchurch. For services to local government and in connection with social welfare movements.
 Roberts Mathew Firth – Tourist Commissioner and Her Majesty's consul-general for New Zealand at San Francisco.
 Frederick Willie Freeman – a civil engineer of Christchurch.
 John Norman Millard. For services to education and sport, especially rugby football.
 The Reverend Alexander Thomas Thompson. For services to the community, especially in connection with the British and Foreign Bible Society and St Andrew's Boys' College, Christchurch.
 Henry Toogood – a consulting engineer of Wellington.

Military division
 Lieutenant-Colonel John Bryden Harrison – New Zealand Regiment (Regular Force).
 Lieutenant-Colonel Gordon Anderson Lindell  – Royal New Zealand Engineers (Territorial Force).
 Wing Commander Percival Patrick O'Brien – Royal New Zealand Air Force.

Member (MBE)
Civil division
 Henry Albert Anderson. For services to local government, especially as mayor of Mount Albert.
 Charles Frederick Bennett  – of Auckland. For social welfare services.
 Elfie Sarah Masters Boyle – president of the New Zealand Private Hospitals Association.
 Mabel Alice Buckley – of Devonport, Auckland. For social welfare services.
 Charles Collins – of Wellington; city organist and treasurer of the City Council.
 Catherine Wishart Doctor. For social welfare services, especially as president of the New Zealand Free Kindergarten Union and of the Wellington Association.
 Olive Marion Fairbairn – of Dunedin. For social welfare services.
 John Farrell – of Auckland. For services to the stage.
 Lilian Ada Hill. For services as a public health nurse and nurse inspector.
 Sidney Edward Langstone . For services to the St John Ambulance Association at Auckland.
 Jessie Iris Martin. For services to nursing, and especially as matron of the Cook Hospital, Gisborne.
 Gladys Irene McDonald – of Dunedin. For social welfare services.
 Jane McDougal – of Wanganui. For social welfare services.
 Nellie Eileen O'Callaghan . For services in connection with the Blinded Servicemen's Trust Board and as matron of the Rawhiti Surgical Hospital, Auckland.
 Ernest John Osborne – of Birkenhead. For service to local government.
 The Reverend William John Robertson – chaplain to the Presbyterian Social Service Association of Southland.
 Elsie Smith – a nurse in the Maori Anglican Mission, Koriniti, Whanganui River, for 25 years.
 Roy Hunter Stevenson – of Dunedin. For social welfare services.
 Roderick Syme – of Hawera. For services as an agricultural instructor and in fostering mountaineering.
 Herbert Edward Walters – of Kerikeri. For services to local government and in connection with land development.
 Alfred Graeme Cooke Yarborough. For services to local government in Hokianga.

Military division
 Senior Commissioned Master-at-Arms Jack Alan Cameron – Royal New Zealand Navy.
 Major (temporary) Eric Rowland Firth  – New Zealand Regiment (Regular Force).
 Warrant Officer Class II Alfred Benjamin Parkes – Royal New Zealand Armoured Corps (Territorial Force).
 Major Godfrey Henry Stace  – Royal New Zealand Armoured Corps (Territorial Force).
 Flight Lieutenant Aubrey Leonard Herbert Forster – Royal New Zealand Air Force.
 Flight Lieutenant Eric Wilson  – Royal New Zealand Air Force.
 Warrant Officer Cyril Benjamin Hill – Royal New Zealand Air Force.

Companion of the Imperial Service Order (ISO)
 Russell Gladstone Dick – surveyor-general, Lands and Survey Department.
 Robert Drane Steel – private secretary to the Minister of Agriculture.

British Empire Medal (BEM)
Military division
 Chief Petty Officer Telegraphist Kenneth Peter Illsley – Royal New Zealand Navy.
 Petty Officer John Burnham Martin – Royal New Zealand Navy.
 Chief Petty Officer Writer Brian Calvert Turnbull – Royal New Zealand Navy.
 Chief Engineering Mechanic Roy William Broderick Waide – Royal New Zealand Navy.
 Warrant Officer Class II (temporary) Frederick Brown – Royal New Zealand Infantry (Territorial Force}.
 Flight Sergeant Pare Tewai – Royal New Zealand Air Force.
 Sergeant Neville Haig McDonald – Royal New Zealand Air Force.

Air Force Cross (AFC)
 Flying Officer Gordon Harry Saywell Tosland – Royal New Zealand Air Force.

Queen's Commendation for Valuable Service in the Air
 Warrant Officer Anthony Francis Whistler Mason – Royal New Zealand Air Force.

References

Birthday Honours
1955 awards
1955 in New Zealand
New Zealand awards